USS Abilene (PF-58), a , was in the service of the United States Navy, named after the city of Abilene, Kansas.

Construction
She was laid down on 6 May 1943 as Bridgeport, Maritime Commission (MARCOM) hull 1465, and originally classified as patrol gunboat, PG-166, on 6 May 1943, at the Globe Shipbuilding Company in Superior, Wisconsin. She was launched on 21 August 1943, sponsored by Mrs. Thomas F. Rogers; acquired by the Navy on 31 May 1944; renamed Abilene, reclassified a patrol frigate, and assigned hull number PF-58 on 28 June 1944; and commissioned on 28 October 1944 with Lieutenant Commander Chester I. Steel, USCG, in command.

Service history
Following shakedown at Bermuda, Abilene steamed to NS Argentina, Newfoundland, where she joined the North Atlantic Weather Patrol. She operated on this station through May 1945, conducting weather observations and rendering navigational assistance to airplanes.

After a brief period of upkeep at Boston, Massachusetts, Abilene assumed air-sea rescue duties in the Atlantic in June 1945.  As a member of Task Group 24.5, the patrol vessel collected weather data while serving as a plane guard along the air routes between Europe and the United States.

Decommissioning
Abilene was decommissioned at New Orleans, Louisiana, on 21 August 1946.  Her name was struck from the Navy list on 13 November 1946.  The ship was sold to the government of the Netherlands on 5 May 1947.

The ship was renamed Cirrus, and eventually scrapped in 1969.

Notes 

Citations

Bibliography 

Online resources

External links
 

Tacoma-class frigates
World War II patrol vessels of the United States
Ships built in Superior, Wisconsin
1943 ships
Ships transferred from the United States Navy to the Royal Netherlands Navy